These are the official results of the athletics competition at the 2001 Goodwill Games which took place on September 4–7, 2001 in Brisbane, Australia.

Men's results

100 meters
September 5

200 meters
September 6

400 meters
September 4

800 meters
September 5

Mile
September 6

5000 meters
September 6

10,000 meters
September 7

110 meters hurdles
September 5

400 meters hurdles
September 4

3000 meters steeplechase
September 5

4 x 100 meters relay
September 7

4 x 400 meters relay
September 7

20,000 meters walk
September 4

High jump
September 7

Pole vault
September 7

Long jump
September 6

Triple jump
September 4

Shot put
September 7

Discus throw
September 5

Hammer throw
September 7

Javelin throw
September 6

Decathlon
September 6–7

Women's results

100 meters
September 4

200 meters
September 5

400 meters
September 4

800 meters
September 5

Mile
September 6

5000 meters
September 4

10,000 meters
September 7

100 meters hurdles
September 4

400 meters hurdles
September 5

3000 meters steeplechase
September 4

4 x 100 meters relay
September 7

4 x 400 meters relay
September 7

20,000 meters walk
September 6

High jump
September 6

Pole vault
September 5

Long jump
September 7

Triple jump
September 6

Shot put
September 5

Discus throw
September 6

Hammer throw
September 4

Javelin throw
September 4

Heptathlon
September 4–5

References

2001
Goodwill Games